Eugoa winneba is a moth of the family Erebidae. It was described by Lars Kühne in 2007. It is found in Ghana.

References

 

Endemic fauna of Ghana
winneba
Moths described in 2007